Agatha-Christie-Krimipreis (Agatha Christie Crime Award) was a German literary prize for unpublished crime short stories awarded from 2003 to 2014. Stories with a maximum of ten manuscript pages were requested on a specified topic, changing annually. The 25 best stories were published in an anthology by Fischer Taschenbuchverlag. The awards were presented as part of the annual Krimifestival München (Munich Crime Story Festival), with the three best stories being awarded a non-cash prize. The namesake of the prize was the English crime writer Agatha Christie.

Initially renowned sponsors could be found by the Fischer-Verlag and the annual awards were held in changing, upscale settings. Since 2011, however, the accompanying thriller anthology only appears as an E-book and the value of the prizes for the three winning authors has been steadily declining. The award ceremony was last held in 2014.

Winners
 2003: Maria Elisabeth Straub for A conta, faz favor!
 2004: Christoph Spielberg for Happy Birthday
 2006: Cornelia Schneider for Der Spucker
 2007: Silke Andrea Schuemmer for Rattenpack
 2008: Heike Koschyk for Schachmatt
 2009: Veit Bronnenmeyer for Eigenbemühungen
 2010: Sabine Trinkaus for Am Tatort
 2011: Marcus Winter for Einmal ein Held sein
 2012: Claus Probst für Sieben Leben
 2013: Marion Schwenninger für Gurkenmord
 2014: Peter Joerg für Kleinmann befreit sich

References

Literary awards of Munich
Awards established in 2003
2003 establishments in Germany
Awards disestablished in 2014
2014 disestablishments in Germany